Muhammad Arshad Chaudhry is a Pakistani politician who had been a member of the Provincial Assembly of the Punjab from August 2018 till January 2023.

Early life and education
He was born on 1 November 1959 in Sarai Alamgir, Pakistan.

He has a degree of Bachelor of Arts and Bachelor of Laws.

Family 
He is from the Chaach family of Sarai Alamgir. His brother Chaudhry Muhammed Farooq (Urdu: چودھری محمد فاروق‎; November 1959 – 29 December 2002) was a member of the Punjab Assembly from 1988 to 1997, and again in 2002. He was Minister for Law and Parliamentary Affairs during 1993–97, and the provincial president of PML. His uncle Chaudhry Abdul Rahman remained Tehseel Nazim Sarai Alamgir two times.

Political career.

He was elected to the Provincial Assembly of the Punjab as a candidate of The Pakistan Muslim League (Quaid e Azam Group) in by elections 2002 after his brothers death. He remained a member of  Provincial Assembly of the Punjab from 2002-2013. For the third time he was elected MPA on a ticket of Pakistan Tehreek-e-Insaf from Constituency PP-34 (Gujrat-VII) in 2018 Pakistani general election.

References

Living people
Punjab MPAs 2018–2023
Pakistan Tehreek-e-Insaf MPAs (Punjab)
1959 births